Gianluca Muniz Estevam (born 9 May 2001), sometimes known as Gian, is a Brazilian footballer who currently plays for Al Urooba on loan from Al Wahda.

Career statistics

Club

Notes

References

External links

2001 births
Living people
Brazilian footballers
Brazilian expatriate footballers
Association football fullbacks
UAE Pro League players
Cruzeiro Esporte Clube players
F.C. Alverca players
Al Wahda FC players
Al Urooba Club players
Expatriate footballers in Portugal
Brazilian expatriate sportspeople in Portugal
Expatriate footballers in the United Arab Emirates
Brazilian expatriate sportspeople in the United Arab Emirates